IF Björklöven (often simply referred to as Björklöven or Löven) is a Swedish professional ice hockey club in Umeå, Västerbotten, in northern Sweden. The club is currently playing in the second-tier league HockeyAllsvenskan as of the 2014–15 season, but has played 15 seasons in the top Swedish league Elitserien (1976–77, 1978–79 to 1988–89, 1993–94, 1998–99 and 2000–01, becoming national champions in 1987).

History
IF Björklöven was formed in 1970 when the ice hockey sections of IFK Umeå and Sandåkerns SK were merged. The IFK Umeå team had already at times been referred to as 'björklöven' (the birch leaves) as a tongue in cheek reference to Canadian ice hockey and Umeå being known as the 'city of birch trees', and after the merger the nickname became the official team name.

The team was quite successful at the Elitserien (SEL) level, the highest league in Sweden, during the 1980s and won the Swedish championship in 1987. They were, however, relegated only two years later, and since then have not been able to establish themselves permanently in the Elitserien again. Instead, they have mostly played in the second-tier league Allsvenskan, save for a few short stints in the 90s. Some notable players from Björklöven are Calle Johansson, Ulf Dahlén, Tore Öqvist and twins Patrik Sundström and Peter Sundström.

From 2001 to 2010, Björklöven played in HockeyAllsvenskan, the second highest ice hockey league for men in Sweden. Although the team finished 12th in the 2009–10 HockeyAllsvenskan season (which meant that the team was set to play in HockeyAllsvenskan the following season), the club was in big economical problems in March–May 2010. The club went bankrupt in April 2010, but got the bankruptcy allayed a month later. Despite huge further efforts by the club to obtain an elite license to play in HockeyAllsvenskan the following season, the Swedish Ice Hockey Association (SIHA) decided not to give Björklöven an elite license and thus the team was relegated to the third-tier league Division 1 for the 2010–11 season. Björklöven was eventually promoted back to HockeyAllsvenskan in the 2012–13 season.

The team has recently had many promising young players, including Alexander Hellström, Alexander Sundström, Patrik Nevalainen, Daniel Rahimi and Kristofer Berglund. Due to lack of funds however, Björklöven lost all of these young players to other teams, although Hellström, Sundström and Nevalainen later rejoined the team.

Björklöven Dam   
Björklöven's women's side currently plays in Damettan, in the north division of the second tier of Swedish women's hockey. Ahead of the 2018–19 SDHL season, the club hosted the Damcup Umeå exhibition tournament between Björklöven, Luleå HF/MSSK, Modo Hockey, and the Japanese national team. Luleå were crowned winners of the tournament after winning all three of their games.

Season-by-season records

Players and personnel

Current roster

Team captains

 John Slettvoll, 1976–77
 Ulf Lundström, 1977–80
 Torbjörn Andersson, 1981–83
 Rolf Berglund, 1983–86
 Peter Andersson, 1986–89
 Ulf Andersson, 1989–90
 Peter Andersson, 1990–93
 Patrik Sundström, 1993–94
 Peter Andersson, 1994–95
 Jens Öhman, 1995–96
 Robert Ljunggren, 1996–97
 Peder Bejegård, 1997–98
 Jens Öhman, 1998–99
 Christian Lechtaler, 1999–01
 Göran Hermansson, 2001–02
 Jörgen Hermansson, 2002–05
 Mats Lavander, 2005–07
 Magnus Gästrin, 2007–09
 Fredrik Öberg, 2009–10
 Martin Johansson, 2010–11
 Johan Jarl, 2011–13
 Mats Lavander, 2013–14
 Stefan Öhman, 2014–17
 Fredric Andersson, 2017–present

Honored members

Notable players

 Ric Jackman
 Greg Parks
 Andrew Raycroft
 Brian Watts
 François Rozenthal
 Maurice Rozenthal
 Peter Andersson
 Mikael Andersson
 Ulf Dahlén
 Calle Johansson
 Peter Sundström
 Brad DeFauw

References

External links

IF Björklöven official website
Green Devils supporter's club
Gröngult, independent fansite

 
Ice hockey teams in Västerbotten County
Ice hockey teams in Sweden
Sport in Umeå
1970 establishments in Sweden
Ice hockey clubs established in 1970
HockeyAllsvenskan teams